Loweriella boltoni is a species of ant and is the only known species of genus Loweriella. The species is only known from workers collected in the rainforest in Sarawak, Malaysia.

References

External links

Dolichoderinae
Monotypic ant genera
Hymenoptera of Asia
Insects of Malaysia